Hallo is a variant of "hello".

Hallo may also refer to:

 Hallo (film), a 2007 Malayalam film
 Hallo, a foundry type made by Ludwig & Mayer
 Hallo, Pennsylvania, or Hollo, a community in the US
 Hallo Bay, a bay in Alaska, US
 Hallo Newspaper (Haló noviny), a newspaper in the Czech Republic
 William W. Hallo (1928–2015), American Assyriologist

See also
 Allo (disambiguation)
 Hallo Hallo (disambiguation)
 Hello (disambiguation)
 Hullo, a village in Lääne County, Estonia